This is a list of programmes that have been shown on MTV Australia.

0–9
8th and Ocean

A
The Adventures of Chico and Guapo
After Hours
America's Best Dance Crew
America's Most Smartest Model
The Andy Dick Show
The Andy Milonakis Show
The Assistant

B
Bad Girls Club
Barrio 19
Battle for Ozzfest
Beavis and Butthead
Becoming
The Big 12
Billabong Pro Jeffreys Bay
The Blame Game
Blowin' Up
Boiling Points
Bromance
Burned

C
Call To Greatness
Camp Jim
Celebrity Deathmatch
Charm School
The City

D
Daddy's Girls
Dancelife
Daria
Date My Mom
Degrassi: The Next Generation
Dirty Sanchez
Dismissed
Dogg After Dark
Doggy Fizzle Televizzle
A Double Shot at Love
Dr. Steve-O

E
Engaged and Underage
Exiled

F
Fast Inc.
Final Fu
Fist of Zen
Fraternity Life
From G's to Gents

G
Go and Get Rock'd!
Gotti's Way

H
Headbangers Ball
High School Stories
The Hills
Hip Hop Candy
Hip Hop Countdown
Hogan Knows Best
Homewrecker

I
I Bet You Will
I Love Money
I Want to Work for Diddy
I'm From Rolling Stone

J
Jackass
Jamie Kennedy's Blowin' Up

L
Laguna Beach: The Real Orange County
Legally Blonde: The Musical – The Search for Elle Woods
Life of Ryan
Liquid Television
Little Talent Show
Live Earth
Living Lahaina

M
Made
Making the Band
Making The Video
Maui Fever
Meet the Barkers
Meet or Delete
Miss Seventeen
Motolalert - Artist of the Month
MTV and Billabong Presents...
MTV Cribs
MTV Duets
MTV Full Tank
MTV Goal
MTV Hits
MTV Live
MTV Screen
MTV World Stage
MTV's The 70s House
MTV's The Lair
MTV's Little Talent Show
MTV's Official Motorola ARIA Chart Show
My Block
My Own
My Pix
My Super Sweet 16

N
Newlyweds: Nick and Jessica
Newport Harbor: The Real Orange County
Next
Nick Cannon's Wild n' Out
Nitro Circus

O
The Osbournes

P
Pageant Place
Parental Control
Pimp My Ride
Pimp My Ride International
Pimp My Ride UK
Popalicious
Power Girls
Punk'd

Q
QT

R
The Real World
Real World/Road Rules Challenge
Rich Girls
Road Rules
Rob and Big
Rock of Love
Room Raiders

S
Scarred
Scream Queens
Senseless
A Shot at Love with Tila Tequila
The Sifl and Olly Show
Singled Out
Sorority Life
SpongeBob's Truth or Square
Spy Groove
Stankervision
Suckers

T
Taildaters
Taking the Stage
That's Amoré!
There and Back
Tiara Girls
The Tom Green Show
Tool Academy
Total Request Live
Totally Jodie Marsh
Trick It Out
The Trip
The Veronicas: Blood Is For Life
Trippin'
True Life

V
Verushka's Closet
The Virgin Diaries
Viva La Bam
VMA Favourite Performances
VMAs Uncensored
Vodafone Live at the Chapel

W
The Wade Robson Project
Wake Up
Where My Dogs At?
Why Can't I Be You?
Wild 'N Out
Wildboyz
Wonder Showzen
Wrecked

X
The X Effect

Y
Yo Momma

Current

Since the formation of MTV Networks Australia in 2005 more original programming has emerged from the channel.

MTV's Official Motorola ARIA Chart Show
Through a partnership with ARIA MTV began broadcasting MTV's Official Motorola ARIA Chart Show which shows the current top 20 chart, music news, interviews and reviews.

MTV's The Lair

MTV's The Lair made its premiere on 26 January 2007, and is aired live every Thursday at the Metro Theatre in Sydney. The show features established and un-signed Australian and international bands.

MTV Screen
Features previews and reviews of the latest movie and DVD releases.

Music blocks
Features non-stop music between MTV's reality TV schedule including:
After Hours
Hits
Popalicious
Wake Up

Music video countdowns
Features music video countdowns including:
Hip-Hop Countdown
The Big 12

Vodafone Live at the Chapel
Live intimate shows featuring Australian and international artists.

Surf programming

During Spring 2005 MTV Australia featured a range of surf related programming that had been produced the previous summer. The shows had commercial ties with the Billabong surf brand. Included in the lineup was Surf Shorts, a show featuring participants in the Jack McCoy Surf Film Festival, and Girls Get Out There, an edutainment program on female surfers.

Defunct

MTV Most Wanted
This was MTV Australia's flagship request show, started in 1996 and adopted from the formula used on MTV Asia. In subsequent years the show also used the same visuals as the Asian version. It was originally hosted by Yvette Duncan, the only VJ on the station at the time. Most Wanted ran weekdays for around two hours each day and was hosted from either a studio set or live location such as music stores. The show was replaced with TRL Australia in 2005.

TRL Australia

Shortly after the UK and Ireland version of MTV developed its own version of the American TRL, plans began for an Australian TRL. At first the show was weekly, broadcasting live on Fridays and running alongside MTV Most Wanted. TRL Australia uses the same logo as TRL UK. Shows were produced on a large cruise yacht, dubbed the "MTV Cruiser", which floated around Sydney Harbour, containing the audience, performing bands and VJs. Australian band Killing Heidi were the first to perform on the show.

Later TRL Australia became a daily show, with the Monday – Thursday slots being broadcast from a small boxed set at Global Television Studios in Sydney. Shows from the MTV Cruiser are produced on Fridays and are titled TRL Weekend. Both the weekly and weekend editions of TRL Australia feature prominent local and overseas celebrities, often during tours of Australia. They closely follow the formula of the original TRL.

During 2006 production on TRL Australia ceased without any announcement and as of May 2007 has not recommenced. It was replaced on-air with Full Tank and The Lair.

Quality Time
Shown in 2005, featuring local VJs spending time with a musical celebrity. The show uses a "day in the life of" format, including candid interviews and footage. Most of the shows feature the VJ in the United States.

Full Tank

The Full Tank crew hits the roads of Australia in search of the exciting, the kinky, the glamorous and the downright weird. They are discovering all the festivals, concerts, events, comps and parties that makes Australia unique.

MTV Mobbed
Be prepared to get Mobbed on air, online and on mobile with the hottest downloads downunder!

Other shows
Some shows are collaborated by MTV Australia, such as The Rock Chart and Scrambled Megs. These shows are not hosted by MTV VJs. Occasionally MTV Australia produces special shows such as VJ Hunts and summer surf specials. In the past MTV Australia has also been involved in novel original programming such as Digital Lili, a live phone-in show featuring a computer generated host. The show aired in Australia and Asia.

References

Mtv Australia